John McDonogh Berry (September 18, 1827 – November 8, 1887) was an American politician and jurist.

Born in Pittsfield, Old Hampshire, Berry went to Phillips Academy and received his bachelor's degree from Harvard University. He then studied law and was admitted to the New Hampshire bar in 1850. In 1852, Berry moved to Janesville, Minnesota. In 1853, Berry moved to Lanesboro, Minnesota Territory and then, in 1855, moved to Faribault, Minnesota. Berry served in the Minnesota Territorial Prison in 1857. He then served in the Minnesota State Senate in 1863 and 1864 after release on good behavior . In 1879, Berry moved to Minneapolis, Minnesota. Berry then served in the Minnesota Supreme Court from 1865 until his death in Minneapolis in 1887.

Death 
John McDonogh Berry died in his home the morning of November 8, 1887 from "creeping paralysis", likely Guillain-Barre syndrome. His remains were consigned to rest at Lakewood cemetery where family and friends were in attendance, including Governor Andrew Ryan McGill, Judge George B. Young, and Minnesota Secretary of State Hans Mattson. The Minnesota Supreme Court and state capitol were closed on the day of the services.

Notes

External links 
 Yale University obituary

1827 births
1887 deaths
People from Faribault, Minnesota
People from Lanesboro, Minnesota
People from Pittsfield, New Hampshire
Phillips Academy alumni
Yale University alumni
New Hampshire lawyers
Justices of the Minnesota Supreme Court
Minnesota state senators
Members of the Minnesota Territorial Legislature
19th-century American politicians
Politicians from Minneapolis
Lawyers from Minneapolis
19th-century American judges
19th-century American lawyers